Harvey Dias Villela (5 August 1898 – 1974) was a Brazilian sports shooter. He competed at the 1936 Summer Olympics and 1952 Summer Olympics.

References

1898 births
1974 deaths
Brazilian male sport shooters
Olympic shooters of Brazil
Shooters at the 1936 Summer Olympics
Shooters at the 1952 Summer Olympics
Sportspeople from Rio de Janeiro (city)